Weight is a surname. Notable people with the surname include:

 Carel Weight (1908–1997), British artist
 Doug Weight (born 1971), American ice hockey player
 Greg Weight (born 1946), Australian photographer

See also
Waite (name)
Weight (disambiguation)